Someone Like Me is an American sitcom television series created by Bruce Helford, that aired on NBC from March 14 until April 25, 1994.

Premise
The values of an 11-year-old clash with those of her baby boomer mom.

Cast
Gaby Hoffmann as Gaby Stepjak
Patricia Heaton as Jean Stepjak
Anthony Tyler Quinn as Steven Stepjak
Nikki Cox as Samantha Stepjak
Joseph Tello as Evan Stepjak
Jane Morris as Dorie Schmidt
Raegan Kotz as Jane Schmidt
Matthew Thomas Carey as Neal Schmidt
Krystin Moore as Marla

Episodes

References

External links
 

1994 American television series debuts
1994 American television series endings
1990s American sitcoms
English-language television shows
NBC original programming
Television shows set in St. Louis
Television series by ABC Studios
Television series by Mohawk Productions
Television series created by Bruce Helford